Zaamar is a sum of Töv Province in Mongolia.With a total area of 2,900 square kilometers, a population of 37,500, and 7,500 households, it is one of the largest areas in Mongolia.

Geography 
The Zaamar range is home to birch, poplar, and ebony trees. Wildlife consists of wolves, red deer, foxes, corsac fox, gazelle, roe deer, and marmot.

Districts of Töv Province